Jiří Bicek (born December 3, 1978) is a Slovak former professional ice hockey winger. He played in the National Hockey League with the New Jersey Devils between 2000 and 2004, winning the Stanley Cup with them in 2003. The rest of his career, which lasted from 1995 to 2018, was mainly spent in Europe. Internationally Bicek played for the Slovak national team at several tournaments, including the 1997 and 2009 World Championships.

Playing career
Bicek was drafted 131st overall by the New Jersey Devils in the 1997 NHL Entry Draft. He then proceeded to play 7 pro seasons in North America, mostly playing for the Albany River Rats of the AHL. In 423 games in Albany, Bicek scored 75 goals and 167 assists for 242 points. In those last four seasons, he was called up to the Devils sporadically. During the 2004–05 NHL lockout, Bicek returned to Slovakia to play for HC Košice. He played 54 games there and scored 18 goals and 41 points. In 62 career NHL games, Bicek has scored 6 goals and 7 assists for 13 points. He won a Stanley Cup in 2003 with the Devils.

During the 2006–2007 season he played for Swedish team Brynäs IF and Finnish KalPa before moved 2008 to JYP in the SM-Liiga, he joined to end of the year 2008 to EHC Biel.

Career statistics

Regular season and playoffs

International

Awards
 2003 — NHL Stanley Cup

References

 2005 NHL Official Guide & Record Book

External links
 

1978 births
Living people
Albany River Rats players
Brynäs IF players
EHC Biel players
HC Karlovy Vary players
Rytíři Kladno players
HC Košice players
HC Prešov players
JYP Jyväskylä players
KalPa players
Leksands IF players
New Jersey Devils draft picks
New Jersey Devils players
Sportspeople from Košice
SaiPa players
Slovak ice hockey right wingers
Södertälje SK players
Stanley Cup champions
Slovak expatriate ice hockey players in Sweden
Slovak expatriate ice hockey players in Switzerland
Slovak expatriate ice hockey players in Finland
Slovak expatriate ice hockey players in the United States
Slovak expatriate ice hockey players in the Czech Republic